Tskitishvili is a Georgian surname. Notable people with the surname include:

Avtandil Tskitishvili (1950–2013), Georgian general
Gocha Tsitsiashvili (born 1973), Israeli Olympic wrestler
Levan Tskitishvili (born 1976), Georgian footballer
Maya Tskitishvili (born 1974), Georgian economist and politician
Nikoloz Tskitishvili (born 1983), Georgian professional basketball player

Georgian-language surnames